Steve Bell (born 10 January 1938), better known by the ring name Steve Veidor, is a former British heavyweight professional wrestler of the 1960s and 1970s, usually billed as The Handsome Heart Throb.

Career
Bell was born in Ellesmere Port, a port in Cheshire, England. After service as a Corporal in the Royal Air Force as a Physical Training Instructor, Veidor took up amateur wrestling. After turning professional, he initially wrestled as Hermann Veidor and Steve Bell. He won the Royal Albert Hall Tournament Trophy on three occasions. On 15 September 1978 Veidor won the European Union Heavyweight Championship at Liverpool, Great Britain.

Veidor made many appearances on ITV's World of Sport, and has wrestled across Europe, worked in films, television game shows and commercials. He appeared alongside other wrestlers in the 1968 cult film The Touchables, directed by Robert Freeman, and as Muscles in Derek Ford's 1973 film Keep It Up, Jack.

Between the months of February and March 1975, Veidor toured New Japan Pro-Wrestling, taking on such Japanese professional wrestling legends Antonio Inoki, Seiji Sakaguchi and Strong Kobayashi.

Championships and accomplishments
Royal Albert Hall Tournament Trophy (3 times)

References

External links

Veidor on the Wrestling Furnace website
Veidor on the Wrestling Heritage website
Information on 'The Touchables'

1938 births
Living people
People from Ellesmere Port
Royal Air Force Physical Training instructors
English male professional wrestlers
Sportspeople from Cheshire
20th-century professional wrestlers